Pain Golema (also Romanized as Pā’īn Golmā; also known as Golmā Pā’īn and Golmā-ye Pā’īn) is a village in Miandorud-e Kuchak Rural District, in the Central District of Sari County, Mazandaran Province, Iran. At the 2006 census, its population was 1,158, in 302 families.

References 

Populated places in Sari County